Bumetopia conspersa is a species of beetle in the family Cerambycidae. It was described by Per Olof Christopher Aurivillius in 1924 and is known from the Philippines.

References

Homonoeini
Beetles described in 1924